The 710s decade ran from January 1, 710, to December 31, 719.

Significant people
 Al-Walid I
 Sulayman ibn Abd al-Malik
 Umar ibn Abd al-Aziz
 Theodosius III

References